Swiss referendum, 2009 may refer to:

 Swiss referendum, February 2009, concerning Bulgarian and Romanian workers
 Swiss referendum, May 2009, concerning (i) biometric passports, (ii) complementary medicine
 Swiss referendum, September 2009, concerning (i) VAT, (ii) public initiatives
 Swiss referendum, November 2009, concerning (i) minarets, (ii) weapons exports, (iii) aviation fuel taxes

See also
 :Category:Referendums in Switzerland